The 1973–74 Série A season was the 53rd season of the Série A, the top level of ice hockey in France. Sporting Hockey Club Saint Gervais won their second league title.

Final ranking
 1st place: Sporting Hockey Club Saint Gervais
 2nd place: Chamonix Hockey Club
 3rd place: Gap Hockey Club
 4th place: Ours de Villard-de-Lans
 5th place: Français Volants
 6th place: Viry-Châtillon Essonne Hockey
 7th place: Club des Sports de Megève
 8th place: CSG Grenoble
 9th place: Diables Rouges de Briançon
 10th place: Club des patineurs lyonnais

External links
List of French champions on hockeyarchives.info

France
1973–74 in French ice hockey
Ligue Magnus seasons